The  (Black Cross) is a flag of Brittany, used as an emblem of the independent duchy in the late Middle Ages. In the Breton language,  means cross and  means black.

Origins

There is uncertainty about the chronology of its origins. It clearly evolved from the flags of the Crusaders and some evidence shows that the black and white colors were taken from the ermine spots that formed the coat of arms of the dukes of Brittany (adopted early in the 14th century and also used as a standard called the plain ermine flag).

It is widely known that the warriors of the First Crusade used the emblem of the red cross (later known as the St George's Cross). Banners with crosses of distinct colors by nation were first used by Crusaders from about 1188. However, very few Breton barons joined that Third Crusade, so it is more probable that the earliest  was given to Peter I, Duke of Brittany by Pope Gregory IX in 1236 or 1237.

Late Medieval usage

The black cross standard became widely used as the emblem of the Breton soldiers and as the flag for the ships from the end of the Hundred Years' War in the 15th century. Belligerent armies then identified themselves with flags inherited from the Crusades: red cross on white for the English, white cross on blue or red for the French, black cross on white for the Bretons.

It was often combined with the ducal coat of arms, hence a flag with ermine spots in each quarter. 

Some miniatures of the 15th century depict events of the previous century (at the beginning of the Hundred Years' War) by representing Breton knights with the black cross, but it is not really known if the Bretons fought under this emblem during that century.

Later use
The  was the flag representing Brittany on nautical charts of the 16th century. After annexation of 1532, there was never any treaty of union, the admiralty of Brittany kept using the black cross flag for Breton ships (with a modified design).

It also remained the basis for the flags of Nantes and temporarily for those of Saint-Malo and Brest.

The black cross was largely forgotten after the French Revolution, but some Catholic groups and scouts used it again at the end of the 19th century.

This flag has been largely replaced by the  during the 20th century. The latter is used by moderate nationalists and the general public, including the regional administration.

The  has been revived since the late 1990s and was briefly regarded as an emblem of right-wing Breton nationalists (like Adsav), but it is now more and more popular. On the basis of medieval miniatures, a version of the flag was adopted as the emblem of the town of Guérande in 1999. It was also used to create the new flag of Saint-Nazaire in 2008.

Similarity to other flags

This flag is an exact negative of the flag of Cornwall, sometimes known as Saint Piran's Flag. The connections between Cornwall and Brittany are well documented but the historical links between the two flags, if any exist, are unknown.

The United Baltic Duchy flag is similar in appearance but is a Nordic Cross, rather than an equilateral cross.

References
Les drapeaux bretons de 1188 à nos jours (English: The Breton flags, from 1188 until now) by Philippe Rault, published by Coop Breizh (in French), (1998) 
Guide des drapeaux bretons et celtes (English: Guide of Breton and Celtic flags) by Divi Kervella and Mikael Bodlore-Penlaez, published by Yoran Embanner (in French), (2008)

External links
Bannieloù Breizh, the vexillological and heraldic Society of Brittany (in English) 
http://www.nationalflaggen.de/flags-of-the-world/flags/fr-bz-du.html

Flags of France
Medieval Brittany
Flags with crosses